Kuwabara (written:  lit. "mulberry field") is a Japanese surname. Notable people with the surname include:

 Bruce Kuwabara (born 1949), Canadian architect
 Kineo Kuwabara (1913–2007), Japanese photographer and editor
, Japanese ice hockey player
 Honinbo Shusaku (1829–1862), born as Torajirō Kuwabara, Japanese Go player
, Japanese water polo player
 Shisei Kuwabara (born 1936), Japanese photojournalist

Fictional characters 
 Kazuma Kuwabara, a character in YuYu Hakusho media
 Shizuru Kuwabara, a character in YuYu Hakusho media
 Kuwabara Hon'inbo, a character in Hikaru no Go media

See also
 "Kuwabara kuwabara", a Japanese phrase which is said to ward off lightning

Japanese-language surnames